Alexander Filippovich Vedernikov (23 December 1927 – 9 January 2018) was a Soviet and Russian opera and chamber singer (bass) and teacher. He was the soloist of the Bolshoi Theatre of the USSR from 1958–1990.

His son was the Russian conductor Alexander Vedernikov.

Awards 
 Winner of the performers competition of World Festival of Youth and Students (2nd Prize, 1953)
 Winner of Robert Schumann International Competition for Pianists and Singers (1956)
Winner of the All-Union competition for the execution of works by Soviet composers (1st prize, 1956)
Honored Artist of the RSFSR (1961)  
People's Artist of the RSFSR (1967)  
 USSR State Prize (1969) 
People's Artist of the USSR (1976)

References

External links
 Biography on the site of the Russian Opera Theater (in Russian)
 Оперная дискография

1927 births
2018 deaths
Soviet male opera singers
People from Sovetsky District, Kirov Oblast
People from Yaransky Uyezd
Communist Party of the Soviet Union members
Honorary Members of the Russian Academy of Arts
Moscow Conservatory alumni
Honored Artists of the RSFSR
People's Artists of the RSFSR
People's Artists of the USSR
Recipients of the Order "For Merit to the Fatherland", 4th class
Recipients of the Order of Friendship of Peoples
Recipients of the Order of the Red Banner of Labour
Recipients of the USSR State Prize
Russian basses
Russian music educators
Soviet music educators